Saraikela State also spelt Seraikela, Saraikella or Seraikella (Odia: ଷଢେ଼ଇକଳା), was a princely state in India during the era of the British Raj, in the region that is now the Jharkhand state. Its capital was at Saraikela.

The state had an area of 1163 km2 which yielded an average revenue of Rs.92,000 in 1901, and was one of the nine Chota Nagpur States under the authority of the governor of Bengal Presidency. The last ruler of the state, Raja Aditya Pratap Singh Deo, signed the merger agreement acceding to the Indian Union on 18 May 1948.

History
The state was founded in 1620 by Raja Bikram Singh (a forerunner to the ruling family's current nomenclature of Singh Deo. The state came under the influence of the Maratha rulers of Nagpur in the 18th century, and became a princely state of British India in 1803, at the conclusion of the Second Anglo-Maratha War at Deogaon of Orissa. After the war, the East India Company included the Saraikela princely state under the governance of the Chhota Nagpur Commissioner.

In 1912 Saraikela came under the authority of the province of Bihar and Orissa, which was newly created from the eastern districts of Bengal. In 1936 the state was placed under the authority of the Orissa Province. Saraikela, along with 24 other princely states of the Eastern States Agency, acceded to the Government of India on 1 January 1948, with a will to merge the princely state with Orissa province of the Indian Republic.

As a result, both Saraikela and Kharsawan princely states were merged with Orissa in 1948. On 1 January 1948 itself, the tribals of these two princely states, who were in a majority, revolted against the merger with Orissa. This was supported by Patayet Sahib Maharajkumar Bhoopendra Narayan Singh Deo, third son of Raja Aditya Pratap Singh Deo, as a result of which he was imprisoned to ensure the popular movement died down. The central government appointed a commission under Mr. Baudkar to look into the matter. On the basis of the Baudkar commission report, Saraikela and Kharsawan princely states were merged with Bihar on 18 May 1948. These two princely states became part of Jharkhand when the state was separated from Bihar on 15 November 2000. From 18 May 1948 onward, many non-tribal Oriyas of the districts of Saraikela Kharsawan, East Singhbhum, and West Singhbhum have migrated and settled permanently in Odisha.

Rulers
Former rulers bore the title of 'Kunwar' until 1884. The rulers are descendants of the Porahat royal family.

Kunwars
 1620 – 1677        Bikram Singh I
 1677 – 1728        Nru Singh 
 1728 – 1743        Satrughan Singh
1743 – 1818            Abhiram Singh                      ( 1818)
 1818 – 1823        Bikram Singh II                    (d. 1823) 
 1823 – 1837        Ajamber Singh                      (d. 1837) 
 1837 – 1883        Chakradhar Singh                   (b. 1808 – d. 1883) 
25 Nov 1883 – Nov 1884   Udit Narayan Singh                 (b. 1849 – d. 1931)

Rajas
Nov 1884 – 9 December 1931         Udit Narayan Singh                 (s.a.)
 9 December 1931 – 15 August 1947  Aditya Pratap Singh                (b. 1887 – d. 1969)

Titular Rajas
                            Tribhuvan Singhdeo   1969 – 1993           ( b. 1930 – d. 1993)
                           Vikram Singhdeo 1993 – Present

See also
Political integration of India
Kharsawan State

References 

Princely states of India
History of Jharkhand
Seraikela Kharsawan district
Rathores
1620 establishments in India